Carex magellanica, or the boreal bog sedge, is a Carex species that is native to North America. It is listed as endangered in Connecticut.

Description

Carex magellanica grows loosely tufted from a short to long rhizome. Its terminal spikelet is contains only the stamen, with one to four other spikelets that are ovoid and pistillate, arranged on drooping, slender peduncles.

References

magellanica
Flora of North America